The Joint Control Commission (COC; , ОКК) is a tri-lateral peacekeeping force and joint military command structure from Moldova, Transnistria, and Russia that operates in a demilitarized zone on the border between the Republic of Moldova and Ukraine. The disputed territory between the two is controlled by the Pridnestrovian Moldavian Republic (Transnistria, PMR).

History
Following the Transnistria War, the Joint Control Commission was established on the initiative of Moldovan and Russian presidents Mircea Snegur and Boris Yeltsin by the signing of a cease-fire agreement on July 21, 1992. It consists of soldiers and officers from Moldovan, Transnistian and Russian military. In 1998, the commission was enlarged by the addition of 10 Ukrainian officers as military observers. Moreover, the Organization for Security and Co-operation in Europe also has a Transnistria-based observation mission and participates in all JCC meetings. The current peacekeeping mechanism is a multi-state mission equipped with an international mandate that began deployment on 29 July 1992.

Of the three original sides supplying troops, Russia has traditionally provided the most with Moldova second and the smallest contingent provided by Transnistria. As of 2006, however, both Moldova and the PMR participate with slightly more soldiers than Russia: Moldova currently supplies 403 men to the force, the PMR 411 men and Russia up to 385 men.

Mission
The Joint Control Commission is charged with ensuring observance of the ceasefire and security arrangements and has generally been successful, as the armed conflict has not at any time re-erupted since 1992. The demilitarized buffer zone, known locally as the Dniester Valley Security Zone, roughly follows the outline of the Dniester river. It is 225 kilometres long and from 1 to 15 kilometres wide.

As per the 1992 agreement with Moldova, Russia has a right to keep 2,400 troops in Transnistria. However, as of 2006 the number of Russian troops was just 1,500, with between 349 and 385 of those assigned to JCC at any given time.

See also
 Cobasna ammunition depot
 Russian military presence in Transnistria

References

External links 
 http://www.okk-pridnestrovie.org/p0088.htm

Transnistria conflict
History of Transnistria since 1991
Transnistria War
Politics of Transnistria
Political organizations based in Transnistria
Politics of Moldova
Military of Moldova
Military of Russia